Kim Hyeon-uk (born 22 June 1995) is a South Korean footballer who plays as midfielder for Jeonnam Dragons FC in K-League 2.

Career
Kim joined K League 1 side Jeju United before 2017 season starts.

References

1996 births
Living people
Association football midfielders
South Korean footballers
Jeju United FC players
Gangwon FC players
K League 1 players